Mohamed Ahmed Youssef Salmeen (born 4 November 1980) is a Bahraini former professional footballer who played for Muharraq and the Bahrain national team. He was captain of the Bahrain national team and wore the number 10 jersey for his club and country. He is the son of Bahraini footballer Ahmed Salmeen. Salmeen participated in three World Cup qualifying campaigns.

He played in Qatar from 2004 to 2007 with Al-Arabi.

Club career
Salmeen announced the retirement in 2016.

International career

Youth level
Salmeen appeared in all three matches for Bahrain in 1997 FIFA U-17 World Championship.

In 2002, he participated with U-23 level in 2002 Asian games that Bahrain reached quarter-final.

Senior level
Salmeen debuted for Bahrain in 2000. He scored the winning goal against Iran in 2000 AFC Asian Cup qualification campaign.

In 2004 AFC Asian Cup Salmeen and his teammates put in a great performance, leading Bahrain to fourth place.

He missed 2011 AFC Asian Cup due to broken leg from pre-tournament friendly match.

He retired from international career after failed to lead Bahrain to the title of 21st Arabian Gulf Cup which held in home country.

Style of style and awards
After the first leg of Bahrain's 2006 FIFA World Cup qualifying match against Trinidad and Tobago, Trinidadi captain Dwight Yorke claimed that Salmeen was good enough to play in the Premiership. Salmeen was shortlisted for being Asian Footballer of the Year, and had a place in the all-star team of the 2004 Asian Cup tournament. He was also once named Player of the Gulf Cup tournament, receiving the Golden Ball.

Personal life
Salmeen's father Ahmed Salmeen played for Muharraq in the 1970s and 1980s. His brother Yousuf Salmeen is a defender, who also plays for Muharraq and has recently won the 2010 league title.

Career statistics

Scores and results list Bahrain's goal tally first, score column indicates score after each Salmeen goal.

See also
 List of men's footballers with 100 or more international caps

References

External links
 

1980 births
Living people
Bahraini footballers
Bahraini expatriates in Qatar
Al-Arabi SC (Qatar) players
Al-Muharraq SC players
Al Dhafra FC players
Qatar Stars League players
UAE Pro League players
2004 AFC Asian Cup players
2007 AFC Asian Cup players
Footballers at the 2002 Asian Games
FIFA Century Club
Association football midfielders
Asian Games competitors for Bahrain
Bahrain international footballers
Bahrain youth international footballers